Heather Ramsdell is an American poet and playwright.

Her work appears in Conjunctions and Verse. She lives in Williamsburg, New York.

Awards
1997 National Poetry Series, for Lost Wax: Poems

Works

Poetry
"from Vague Swimmers", DC Poetry, 2001
"Good Sheep", DC Poetry, 2001

Plays
The Situation Room

Anthologies

References

External links
"Who You Callin’ “Post-Avant”?", Poetry Foundation

20th-century American poets
Year of birth missing (living people)
Living people
21st-century American poets
American women poets
20th-century American women writers
21st-century American women writers